Domenjod is a neighbourhood on the island of Réunion, located on its northern coast.

On the left bank of the Rivière des Pluies, it depends on the commune of Saint-Denis.

Populated places in Réunion
Saint-Denis, Réunion